Rittiyawannalai School (Rit-ti-ya-wan-na-lai) is a public secondary school, elementary school (Grades 1–12) and nursery school in Bangkok, Thailand . It was established by Air Marshal Luong-Thevalit Punluk on 18 September 1947.

Overview
 Address : 171/3151 Phahonyothin Road, Sai Mai, Bangkok 10220
 Abbreviation : R.W. (ฤ.ว)
 Motto : ปญฺญา นรานํ รตนํ ปัญญาเป็นแก้วอันประเสริฐของคนดี or The wisdom is a thing of the good man.
 Colors : Blue and yellow (colors of the Royal Thai Air Force)
 Song : March Rittiyawannalai

History
Rittiyawannalai school was established by Air Marshal Luong-Thevalit Punluk in 1947 for educating military dependent children and people who live around the military base. Ritiya-wannarai was supported by the military. In 1978, the high school section was transferred the responsibility from air force to the Ministry of Education.

Rittiya schools
Rittiyawannalai School (secondary school)
Rittiyawannalai2 School (secondary school)
Rittiyawannalai School (elementary school)
Rittiyawannalai nursery school

Curriculum, grades 10-12
Science-Mathematics (Thai program) 5 rooms
Mathematics-English (Thai program) 4 rooms
English-French (Thai program) 1 room
English-Japanese (Thai program) 1 room
English-Chinese (Thai program) 2 rooms
Thai-Social Science 1 room

Traditions
 Colours Sport
 Student's Drama at Rittiya Hall
 Rittiya Music Awards
 Student Road Show
 Science Week
 Foreign Language Week
 Respect Teachers
 Big Cleaning Day

Colours party
 Chiang San (Yellow)
 Sukhothai (Pink)
 U Thong (Green)
 Ayutthaya (Orange)
 Rattanakosin (Violet)

External links
 http://www.rittiya.ac.th

See also
List of schools in Thailand

Schools in Bangkok
Educational institutions established in 1947
1947 establishments in Thailand
Sai Mai district